Statistics of Austrian national league in the 1965–66 season.

Overview
It was contested by 14 teams, and SK Admira Wien won the championship.

League standings

Results

References
Austria - List of final tables (RSSSF)

Austrian Football Bundesliga seasons
Austria
1965–66 in Austrian football